Gridino is a rural locality (a village) in Klyazminskoye Rural Settlement, Kovrovsky District, Vladimir Oblast, Russia. The population was 133 as of 2010.

Geography 
Gridino is located 7 km southeast of Kovrov (the district's administrative centre) by road. Govyadikha is the nearest rural locality.

References 

Rural localities in Kovrovsky District